In ancient dining, an acetabulum (Greek: ,) was a vinegar-cup, which, from the fondness of the Greeks and Romans for vinegar, was probably always placed on the table at meals to dip the food in before eating it. The vessel was wide and open above; and the name was also given to all cups resembling it in size and form, to whatever use they might be applied. The cups used by jugglers in their performances were also called by this name. They were commonly of earthenware, but sometimes of glass, silver, bronze, or gold. In anatomy, because of its shape, the acetabulum is the place of pelvis that meets with the head of the femur, forming the hip joint.

References

Containers